Xixiu District is a district in the prefecture-level city of Anshun, Guizhou Province, China. The district spans an area of 1,705 square kilometres, and has a population of 765,399 people as of the 2010 Chinese Census.

Geography 
The district is home to a number of rivers which belong to the larger Yangtze River watershed and the Pearl River watershed. Much of the district's landscape is characterized by karst topography.

Climate 
Xixiu District has an average annual temperature of 14 °C, and an average annual precipitation of 1356 millimetres.

Administrative divisions 
Xixiu District administers 8 subdistricts, 10 towns, 2 townships, and 5 ethnic townships.

Subdistricts 

Towns 

Townships 

Ethnic townships 

Economy 
In 2018, the district's GDP totaled 32.59 billion Yuan and retail sales totaled 7.956 billion Yuan.

Significant mineral deposits in Xixiu District include coal, iron, and marble.

Transportation 
The Gui-Huang Road, a section of National Highway 320 runs through the district.

The  and the Anshun–Liupanshui intercity railway both run through the district.

References

External links

County-level divisions of Guizhou